This is a list of Roman Catholic churches in Metro Manila, Philippines.

The Ecclesiastical Province of Manila covers the Archdiocese of Manila and its eight suffragan dioceses in Metro Manila and surrounding areas of the Greater Manila Area.

Archdiocese of Manila

Diocese of Antipolo

Diocese of Caloocan

Diocese of Cubao

Diocese of Malolos

Diocese of Novaliches

Diocese of Parañaque

Diocese of Pasig

Others

 City of Manila
 Chapel of the Most Blessed Sacrament (Malate)
 Holy Family Parish (San Andres)
 Immaculate Conception Parish (Tondo)
 Most Holy Trinity Parish (Sampaloc)
 Our Lady of the Assumption Parish (Malate)
 Our Lady of Fatima Parish Church (Santa Mesa)
 Our Lady of Peace and Good Voyage Parish Church (Tondo)
 Our Lady of Peñafrancia Parish Church (Paco)
 Our Lady of Perpetual Help Parish Church (Santa Ana)
 Sacred Heart of Jesus Parish (Santa Mesa)
 Saint Anthony of Padua Parish Church (Malate)
 Saint Anthony of Padua Shrine (Sampaloc)
 Saint John Bosco Parish (Tondo)
 Saint Mary Goretti Parish (Paco)
 Saint Peter the Apostle Parish (Paco)
 Saint Pius X Parish Church (Paco)
 San Roque de Manila Parish (Santa Cruz)
 San Roque de Sampaloc Parish (Sampaloc)
 Santa Monica Parish (Tondo)
 Santisimo Rosario Parish (Sampaloc)
 Nuestra Señora de Salvacion De Manila Parish (Santa Mesa)
 Santo Niño Parish Church (Pandacan)
 Shrine of Saint Lazarus (Santa Cruz)
 Shrine of the Holy Face of Jesus (Quiapo)
 Caloocan
 Birhen ng Lourdes Parish Church (Bagong Barrio)
 Our Lady of Lujan Parish (Bagong Barrio)
 San Jose Parish Church
 San Pancracio Parish Church (La Loma)
 Las Piñas
 Our Lady of Fatima Parish
 Christ The King Parish Church (Pamplona)
 Holy Family Parish Church (Almanza)
 Last Supper Of Our Lord Parish Church (Pamplona)
 Mary Immaculate Parish Church (Moonwalk Village, Talon V)
 Our Lady Of The Pillar Parish (Pilar Village)
 Makati
 Holy Cross Parish Church
 Holy Family Parish Church (San Isidro)
 Mary, Mirror of Justice Parish Church (Comembo)
 Mater Dolorosa Parish Church (East Rembo)
 Our Lady of La Paz Parish Church
 Saint Alphonsus Mary de Liguori Parish Church (Magallanes)
 Malabon
 Immaculate Conception Parish Church Malabon
 Santo Rosario de Malabon Parish Church
 Mandaluyong
 Our Lady of the Abandoned Parish Church (Hulo)
 Our Lady of Fatima Parish (Highway Hills)
 Sacred Heart of Jesus Parish Church (Highway Hills)
 Saint Dominic Savio Parish Church (Pag-asa)
 Saint Francis of Assisi Parish Church (Wack Wack Greenhills)
 Marikina
 Holy Family Parish Church (Parang)
 Immaculate Conception Parish Church (Concepcion Uno)
 Saint Gabriel of Our Lady Of Sorrows Parish Church (Marikina Heights)
 Saint Paul of The Cross Parish Church (Concepcion Dos)
 San Jose Manggagawa Parish Church (Barangka)
 Muntinlupa
 Chapel of the Forgiving Lord (Tuloy sa Don Bosco)
 Immaculate Heart of Mary Chapel (Hillsborough)
 Ina ng Awa Parish (New Bilibid Prison Reservation)
 L'Annunziata Parish (Tunasan)
 Mary, Cause of Our Joy Parish Church (Soldier's Hills)
 Mary, Mother of God Parish Archdiocesan Shrine (Bayanan)
 Our Lady of Star Chapel (De La Salle Santiago Zobel School, Ayala Alabang)
 Our Lady of the Abandoned Parish Church (Poblacion)
 Sacred Heart of Jesus Parish (Alabang Hills)
 Saint Benedict Chapel (San Beda College Alabang, Alabang Hills)
 Saint James The Great Parish Church (Ayala Alabang)
 Saint Jerome Emiliani and Santa Susana Parish (Ayala Alabang)
 Saint Peregrine Laziosi Parish (Tunasan)
 San Nicolas de Tolentino Parish (Cupang)
 San Pedro Calungsod Quasi-Parish (New Bilibid Prison Reservation)
 San Roque Parish (Alabang)
 Sto. Niño Chapel (Intercity Homes)
 Navotas
 San Roque Parish Church
 Parañaque
 El Shaddai House of Prayer
 Holy Eucharist Parish Church (Moonwalk)
 Holy Infant Jesus Parish Church (South Admiral)
 Jesus The Divine Healer Parish Church (Tahanan Village)
 Mary Help of Christians National Shrine (Better Living)
 Mary Immaculate Parish Church (Levitown)
 Mary Queen of Apostles Parish (San Antonio Valley 12)
 Our Lady of Beautiful Love Parish (Merville Park)
 Our Lady of the Most Holy Rosary Parish (Multinational Village)
 Our Lady of the Most Holy Rosary Parish (Sun Valley)
 Our Lady of Unity Parish Church
 Our Lady of Peace Parish Church (4th Estate)
 Presentation of The Child Jesus Parish Church (BF Homes)
 Resurrection of Our Lord Parish Church (BF Homes)
 San Antonio de Padua Parish Church (San Antonio Valley)
 San Agustin Parish Church (Moonwalk)
 Santo Niño Parish Church (Sto. Niño)
 San Martin del Porres Parish Church (San Martin de Porres)
 Santo Rita de Cascia Parish Church (Baclaran)
 St. Joseph Parish Church (Tambo)
 Pasay
 Our Lady of The Airways Parish Church (NAIA)
 San Juan Nepomuceno Parish (Malibay)
 San Rafael Parish Church
 San Roque Parish Church
 Santa Clara de Montefalco Church
 Santa Rita de Cascia Parish Church
 San Isidro Labrador Parish Church
 Our Lady of Fatima Parish Church
 Our Lady of Sorrows Parish Church
 Archdiocesan Shrine of Jesus the Way, the Truth and the Life 
 Mary Comforter of the Afflicted Parish Church
 Our Lady of the Blessed Sacrament Parish Church
 Pasig
 Holy Family Parish Church (Kapitolyo)
 Immaculate Conception Parish Church (Manggahan)
 San Antonio Abad Parish Church (Maybunga)
 Santa Lucia Parish Church (Manggahan)
 Santa Rosa de Lima Parish Church (Bagong Ilog)
 Quezon City
 Christ The King Parish Church (Project 6)
 Holy Cross Parish Church (Diliman)
 Holy Family Parish Church (Kamias)
 Holy Family Parish Church (Roxas District)
 Holy Family Quasi-Parish Church (Project 8)
 Holy Spirit Parish Church (BF Homes)
 Immaculate Conception Parish Church (Damar Village)
 Immaculate Conception Parish Church (Sangandaan)
 Immaculate Heart of Mary Parish Church (Diliman)
 Mary, The Immaculate Conception Parish Church (Project 6)
 Most Holy Redeemer Parish Church
 Nativity of Our Lord Parish Church (Cubao)
 Our Lady of Consolation Parish Church (Tandang Sora)
 Our Lady of Fatima Parish Church (Don Manuel)
 Our Lady of Hope Parish Church (Pag-asa)
 Our Lady of Mercy Parish Church (Novaliches)
 Our Lady of The Miraculous Medal Parish Church (Project 4)
 Our Lady of Mount Carmel Parish Church (Project 6)
 Our Lady of Pentecost Parish Church (Loyola Heights)
 Our Lady of Perpetual Help Parish Church (Cubao)
 Our Lady of Perpetual Help Parish Church (Project 8)
 Resurrection of Our Lord Parish Church (Paltok)
 Saint Jude Quasi-Parish Church (West Avenue)
 Saint Paul The Apostle Parish Church (Laging Handa)
 Saint Peter Parish Church (Commonwealth)
 San Antonio de Padua Parish Church (San Francisco del Monte)
 San Lorenzo Ruiz Parish Church (Tierra Verde)
 Santa Maria della Strada Parish Church
 Santa Perpetua Parish Church (D. Tuazon)
 Santa Rita de Cascia Parish (Philam Homes)
 Santa Teresita del Niño Jesus Parish Church
 Santo Cristo de Bungad Parish Church (San Francisco del Monte)
 Santo Niño Shrine (Bago Bantay)
 The Hearts of Jesus And Mary Parish Church (West Triangle)
 The Lord of Divine Mercy Parish Church (Sikatuna Village)
 Transfiguration of Our Lord Parish Church (Murphy)
 San Juan
 Mary The Queen Parish Church (Greenhills)
 Taguig
 Our Lady of The Poor Parish Church (Western Bicutan)
 Saint Ignatius of Loyola Parish Church (Ususan)
 Santo Niño Parish Church (Signal Village)
 Valenzuela
 Holy Family Parish Church (Karuhatan)

See also
List of religious buildings in Metro Manila
Baroque Churches of the Philippines

References

External links
 Roman Catholic Archdiocese of Manila

 
 
Roman Catholic
Churches, Roman Catholic